Jason Deline is a Canadian actor, voice actor, comedian, and director. He is best known for his role as Ernie in Ready or Not, and for voicing the character of Drago in Bakugan Battle Brawlers and its reboot Bakugan Battle Planet.

Career 
Deline voiced Benkei in Beyblade's Metal Saga (Metal Fusion, Metal Masters, and Metal Fury) and Beyblade: Shogun Steel, and provided the voice of Glen in Beyblade's spin-off BeyWheelz. Jason also voiced the character Bow Hothoof in My Little Pony: Friendship Is Magic.

Deline appeared in X-Men: Days of Future Past, as well as the Robert Zemeckis film The Walk starring Joseph Gordon-Levitt and Ben Kingsley. He also recently starred in the BBC miniseries Jonathan Strange & Mr Norrell, as well as Star Trek: Discovery.

Deline is also the voice of many TV and radio commercials, including for such clients as Dodge Ram, Mucho Burrito, Subaru, Coke, Tim Hortons, Tums, Mitsubishi, Movie Central, Coleman, Sleep Country, and Rona.

Deline is a founding member of the sketch comedy troupe Radio Vault, and created the popular Find Your Voice voice-over workshops, as well as the Voice-over for Improvisers workshop at The Second City.

Filmography

Film

Television

References

External links

Living people
Canadian male comedians
Canadian male voice actors
Comedians from Toronto
Male actors from Toronto
Year of birth missing (living people)